José Oliveira de Souza (born March 19, 1978), known in Brazil as Gerry, is a Brazilian former football striker who last played for Espírito Santo Sociedade Esportiva.

Until November 2010, Oliveira played for Alianza. However, he ended his stint at the club and returned to his native Brazil to be with his pregnant wife. He did not rule out the possibility of returning to Alianza in the future.

References

External links
 El Grafico profile 
 Interview 

1978 births
Living people
Sportspeople from Ceará
Brazilian footballers
Brazilian expatriate footballers
C.D. Águila footballers
Alianza F.C. footballers
Expatriate footballers in Portugal
Expatriate footballers in El Salvador
Expatriate footballers in Vietnam
Association football forwards